Revelation is the debut studio album by the Welsh rock band Man and was released in January 1969. It was noted for the simulated orgasm on "Erotica", which received a UK ban.

Track listing

Reissues 
Revelation was remixed and re-released on CD in May 2009 (Esoteric Eclec 2127) including four bonus tracks:
 "Erotica" (First Version)
 "Sudden Life" (Mono Single Mix)
 "Love" (Mono Single Mix)
 "Erotica" (Mono Single Mix) 

The original album has also been re-released on two CD compilations:
 The Dawn of Man (1997) Recall SMD CD 124
 The Definitive Collection (1998) Castle CCSCD 832.
Both these compilations also include the follow-up album 2 Ozs of Plastic with a Hole in the Middle and bonus singles.

Personnel 
 Mike "Micky" Jones – lead guitar, vocals
 Deke Leonard (credited as Roger Leonard) – guitar, harp, piano, percussion, vocals
 Clive John – organ, piano, guitar, vocals
 Jeff Jones – drums, percussion
 Ray Williams – bass

Production
 Production and supervision – John Schroeder
 Engineer – Alan Florence
 Sound Effects – Malcolm Eade

References

External links
 Man – Revelation (1969) album review by Paul Collins, credits & releases at AllMusic
 
 Man – Revelation (1969) album to be listened as stream at Spotify.com on compilation And in the Beginning... The Complete Early Man 1968-69

1969 debut albums
Man (band) albums
Pye Records albums
Obscenity controversies in music
Censorship of music